Svanholm Singers is an internationally acclaimed Swedish male-voice chamber choir founded in 1998 and based in Lund. It comprises around 20 singers, most of whom between 20 and 30 years of age. The choir is led by conductor Sofia Söderberg, and is known for its precise intonation, tonal focus, and vivid dynamics. Svanholm Singers performs concerts and tours mainly in Europe and Asia.

With a core repertoire centered around the Scandinavian and Baltic choral tradition, including collaborations with the Estonian composer Veljo Tormis, the choir promotes new compositions or arrangements for men's chorus. It has commissioned works by, among others, Knut Nystedt (Norway), Peter Bruun (Denmark), John Milne (USA), Arturo Salinas (Mexico), and Swedish composers Tobias Broström, Christian Engquist and Daniel Hjort. Svanholm Singers regularly commissions works by the conductor and members of the choir. In 2012, it announced the Svanholm Singers Composition Award (prize money $9,500), which attracted 46 entries from five continents.

History 
The choir was founded by conductor Eva Svanholm Bohlin in 1998, and named in honor of her father, the opera singer Set Svanholm. In 2001, Sofia Söderberg took over as conductor.

Discography 

 Svanholm Singers (1999)
 Romance (2002)
 december (2004)
 Live in Japan (2006)
 Tormis – Works for Men's Voices (2007)
 Fingerprints (2010)
 Exclusive (2019)

Collaborative works 
With Marius Neset and Daniel Herskedal:

 Neck of the Woods (2012)

Awards 
The choir has won several awards and prizes, including Toner för miljoner (Sweden, 1998), the Takarazuka International Chamber Chorus Contest (Japan 1999), the Madetoja Festival (Finland 2005), the Concorso Internazionale di Canto Corale C. A. Seghizzi (Italy 2006), the 10th International Choir Festival “Tallinn 2007” (Estonia 2007), the LV Certamen Internacional de Habaneras y Polifonía de Torrevieja (Spain 2009), the Béla Bartók International Choir Competition (Hungary 2010), and the Tolosa Choral Contest (Spain, 2016).

References

External links 
 Official website
 YouTube channel

Chamber choirs
Swedish choirs
Musical groups established in 1998
1998 establishments in Sweden